Mohd Fazli bin Paat (born 13 July 1991) is a Malaysian footballer who plays as a goalkeeper for Malaysian club Melaka United.

References

External links

Melaka United S.A. Team

1987 births
Living people
Malaysian footballers
Malaysia Super League players
Association football goalkeepers
Melaka United F.C. players
Malaysian people of Malay descent